Aedh Ua Raithnen, Irish poet, fl. c. 954.

Aedh was a poet, whose few known surviving verses concern the life and death of King Congalach Cnogba of Brega.

Example

A verse of Aedh's is inserted in the Annals of the Four Masters, sub anno 954:

 After despoiling of pleasant Ath-cliath/Which sent the foreigners out of Ireland/Was two years over ten/Of the reign of fair Conghalach.
 Four, fifty, in truth/And nine hundred,—no slight fact/From the birth of Christ at fair/ Bethil Till the death of the noble son of Maelmithigh.

See also

 Óengus mac Óengusa, chief poet of Ireland, died 930.
 Bard Boinne chief poet of Ireland, died 931.
 Finshneachta Ua Cuill, died 958.

External links
 http://www.ucc.ie/celt/published/T100005B/index.html

10th-century Irish poets
Irish male poets